Imtiaz Ahmed Shaikh is a Pakistani politician who is the current and Provincial Minister of Sindh for Energy, in office since 5 September 2018. He has been a member of the Provincial Assembly of Sindh since August 2018.

Previously, he was a Member of the Provincial Assembly of Sindh from May 2013 to May 2018.

Political career

He was elected to the Provincial Assembly of Sindh as a candidate of Pakistan Peoples Party (PPP) from Constituency PS-11 (Shikarpur-I) in 2013 Sindh provincial election.

He was re-elected to Provincial Assembly of Sindh as a candidate of PPP from Constituency PS-7 (Shikarpur-I) in 2018 Sindh provincial election.

On 5 September 2018, he was inducted into the provincial Sindh cabinet of Chief Minister Syed Murad Ali Shah and was appointed as Provincial Minister of Sindh for Energy.

References

Living people
Sindh MPAs 2013–2018
Pakistan People's Party MPAs (Sindh)
Sindh MPAs 2018–2023
Year of birth missing (living people)